Milo Runkle (born April 13,  1984 as Nathan) is a founding partner of Joyful Ventures. He is the co-founder of The Good Food Institute and founder and former president of Mercy For Animals.

Career
Milo Runkle is a founding partner of Joyful Ventures—a social-impact venture capital fund investing in the future of animal-free, sustainable proteins. He founded Mercy For Animals, raising over $130 million to help expand farm animal protection work across the globe.

In 2015, Milo helped launch New Crop Capital, a $40 million venture fund that invested in the most impactful alternative protein companies.

Milo co-founded The Good Food Institute—an international nonprofit making animal-free foods the mainstream choice. The Good Food Institute now boasts over 100 team members and five international offices.

See also
 List of animal rights advocates

Notes

Further reading
Karen Iacobbo, Michael Iacobbo, Vegetarians And Vegans in America Today. Greenwood Publishing Group, 2006.

1984 births
American animal rights activists
Living people
American veganism activists